Radivojević noble family were a Bosnian nobility during the 14th and 15th century. They were vassals to Kosače, who were the lords of the southeastern region of Kingdom of Bosnia at the time, and with whom the family often quarreled for the reason of growing Kosače arbitrariness as they tried to gain and deepen their autonomy from Bosnia royal dominion. Members of Radivojević were participants in King Tomaš's engagements in restoration of royal authority over Kosače domains, and in particular over the towns of Drijeva and Blagaj.

References

Bosnian noble families 
Kingdom of Bosnia